Joseph Gilles Napoléon Ouellet (August 14, 1922 – August 13, 2009) was the Canadian Archbishop of the Roman Catholic Archdiocese of Rimouski in Rimouski, Quebec, from his appointment on April 27, 1973, until his retirement on October 16, 1992. He remained Archbishop Emeritus of Rimouski until his death in 2009.

Ouellet was born in Bromptonville, Quebec, Canada, which is now part of Brompton, on August 14, 1922. He was Bishop of Gaspé from 1968 until 1975. 

He died on August 13, 2009, at the age of 86, one day before his 87th birthday.

References
Catholic Hierarchy: Archbishop Joseph Gilles Napoléon Ouellet, P.M.E. †
Décès de Mgr Gilles Ouellet 

1922 births
2009 deaths
20th-century Roman Catholic archbishops in Canada
People from Rimouski
People from Sherbrooke
Roman Catholic archbishops of Rimouski
Roman Catholic bishops of Gaspé